George Calvin Rogers Sr. (October 9, 1889 – October 22, 1964) was an American football and baseball coach. He was the sixth head football coach at The Citadel, serving for four seasons, from 1913 to 1915 and again in 1919, compiling a record of 14–16–3. He also served as head baseball coach in 1914 and 1915 and resumed the position from 1921 through 1924.

Rogers graduated from The Citadel in 1910, serving as team captain in football, baseball and track, and earning a total of 12 varsity letters. He also coached at the Georgia Military Academy and at high schools in Charleston.

Rogers later served as superintendent of Charleston, South Carolina's public school system, from 1946 until retiring in June 1955. Rogers died on October 22, 1964, at his home in Charleston.

Head coaching record

Football

Baseball

References

External links
 

1889 births
1964 deaths
The Citadel Bulldogs baseball coaches
The Citadel Bulldogs football coaches
The Citadel Bulldogs baseball players
The Citadel Bulldogs football players
The Citadel Bulldogs men's track and field athletes
High school football coaches in South Carolina
Sportspeople from Charleston, South Carolina